David Joseph LaCrosse (born December 22, 1955) is a former American football linebacker who played one season with the Pittsburgh Steelers of the National Football League. He was drafted by the Pittsburgh Steelers in the tenth round of the 1977 NFL Draft. He played college football at Wake Forest University and attended Archbishop Kennedy High School in Conshohocken, Pennsylvania.

References

External links
Just Sports Stats

Living people
1955 births
Players of American football from Philadelphia
American football linebackers
Wake Forest Demon Deacons football players
Pittsburgh Steelers players